5 Star is a chocolate bar produced by Cadbury's and sold in India, Indonesia, Malaysia, Brazil, South Africa, the Philippines and Egypt. It is described as a "caramel and nougat" mix covered with "smooth milk chocolate" and is sold in a golden wrapper decorated with stars.

History
5 Star was launched in India in 1969. In 2016 it was launched in Malaysia and the Philippines in 15g 'mini-bars', 45g standard bars and 150g sharepacks (of 10 mini-bars). It was launched in Brazil the same year but under Cadbury's sister brand Lacta.

5 Star has also been widely distributed in South Africa since 2017 as a replacement for the defunct Tempo bar.

In 2019, 5 Star was released in UK shops and supermarkets for a limited time only.

Varieties
In India, 5 Star is also available in Fruit & Nut, Crunchy and Chomp flavours.

References

Chocolate bars
Cadbury brands
Mondelez International brands